In geometry, the Brocard circle (or seven-point circle) is a circle derived from a given triangle. It passes through the circumcenter and symmedian of the triangle, and is centered at the midpoint of the line segment joining them (so that this segment is a diameter).

Equation

Related points
The two Brocard points lie on this circle, as do the vertices of the Brocard triangle.
These five points, together with the other two points on the circle (the circumcenter and symmedian), justify the name "seven-point circle".

The Brocard circle is concentric with the first Lemoine circle.

Special cases
If the triangle is equilateral, the circumcenter and symmedian coincide and therefore the Brocard circle reduces to a single point.

History
The Brocard circle is named for Henri Brocard, who presented a paper on it to the French Association for the Advancement of Science in Algiers in 1881.

References

External links

See also
Nine-point circle

Circles defined for a triangle